Jeong Bong-sun (born 27 May 1945) is a South Korean gymnast. She competed in five events at the 1964 Summer Olympics.

References

1945 births
Living people
South Korean female artistic gymnasts
Olympic gymnasts of South Korea
Gymnasts at the 1964 Summer Olympics
Place of birth missing (living people)
20th-century South Korean women